The 1984 Delaware Fightin' Blue Hens football team represented the University of Delaware as an independent during the 1984 NCAA Division I-AA football season. Led by 19th-year head coach Tubby Raymond, the Fightin' Blue Hens compiled a record of 8–3. The team played home games at Delaware Stadium in Newark, Delaware.

This season was the first in which Rich Gannon started at quarterback.

Schedule

Roster

References

Delaware
Delaware Fightin' Blue Hens football seasons
Delaware Fightin' Blue Hens football